BZA may refer to:

Benzanthrone, an aromatic hydrocarbon
Board of zoning appeals
Bombenzielanlage, or Bomb Ziel Automat, an analog bombsight computer, used to compute bomb release in German World War II bombers
Bonanza Airport/San Pedro Airport
Station code for Vijayawada Junction railway station